Riedt may refer to:

People
 Friedrich Wilhelm Riedt (1710–1783), German musician

Places
 , Switzerland
 , Switzerland

Other
 Lisa Riedt, Brazilian beachwear manufacturer